Syrnola violacea is a species of sea snail, a marine gastropod mollusk in the family Pyramidellidae, the pyrams and their allies.

Description
The shell is smooth and violaceous. Its length measures 11 mm. The teleoconch contains ten whorls. These are quite plain except for the line of the revolving plica showing through each whorl transversely, just below the sutures. The aperture is somewhat oblique. The outer lip is plain. The columella is one-plaited.

Distribution
This species occurs in the Pacific Ocean off the Loyalty Islands.

References

External links
 OBIS: Syrnola violacea
 

Pyramidellidae
Gastropods described in 1896